Foxfield could refer to:

Horse Racing:
Foxfield Races, a biannual steeplechase race in Albemarle County

Places:
Foxfield, Colorado, United States
Foxfield, County Leitrim, Republic of Ireland
Foxfield, Cumbria, England
Foxfield, Carrickmacross, County Monaghan, Republic of Ireland

A railway  station:
Foxfield railway station

And an unconnected heritage railway:
Foxfield Steam Railway, Staffordshire, England